Diggers is a coming-of-age film directed by Katherine Dieckmann. It portrays four working-class friends who grow up in West Islip, on the South Shore of Long Island, New York, as clam diggers in 1976. Their fathers were clam diggers as well as their grandfathers before them. They must cope with and learn to face the changing times in both their personal lives and their neighborhood.

The movie was written by actor Ken Marino, who also stars.

Plot
A coming-of-age story about four working-class friends growing up on Long Island, New York, as clam diggers. Their fathers were clam diggers as well as their grandfathers before them.

Cast
 Paul Rudd as Hunt
 Lauren Ambrose as Zoey
 Ron Eldard as Jack
 Josh Hamilton as Cons
 Ken Marino as Lozo
 Sarah Paulson as Julie
 Maura Tierney as Gina
 Marie Matiko as Keiko

Release 
Diggers was released on April 27, 2007 and premiered on HDNet on April 27, and was released on DVD on May 1.

External links
  DVD Talk review of Diggers
 

2006 films
2006 drama films
2000s coming-of-age drama films
American coming-of-age drama films
Films scored by David Mansfield
Films set in New York (state)
Films set in the 1970s
Magnolia Pictures films
2000s English-language films
Films directed by Katherine Dieckmann
2000s American films